NGC 4502 is a spiral galaxy located in the constellation Coma Berenices, originally discovered by William Herschel on March 21, 1784. The galaxy features a broad HI line. In the background and to the celestial north of the galaxy, two uncatalogued, distant colliding galaxies can be seen.

See also
 New General Catalogue

References 

4502
Astronomical objects discovered in 1784
Discoveries by William Herschel
Unbarred spiral galaxies
Coma Berenices